Micromyrtus helmsii is a plant species of the family Myrtaceae endemic to Western Australia.

It is found in a few isolated location in the far eastern Goldfields-Esperance region of Western Australia in the Great Victoria Desert where it grows in sandy soils.

References

helmsii
Flora of Western Australia
Plants described in 1980
Taxa named by Ferdinand von Mueller